The Gauntlet (Joseph Green) is a fictional superhero appearing in American comic books published by Marvel Comics.

Publication history
The Gauntlet made his first appearance in She-Hulk #100 and was created by Dan Slott, Stefano Caselli and Eric Powell. He was not referred to by name until the first issue of Avengers: The Initiative. His origin was finally revealed in the 2007 Avengers: The Initiative Annual.

Fictional character biography

Two aliens of unknown origin–one fully armored, the other multi-limbed—engaged in a struggle as they descended to Earth. Both extraterrestrials died as they entered the atmosphere, and their weapons were scattered across the planet's surface. The US government tracked the crash site of two of the weapons to the Middle East, where Sergeant Joseph Green was dispatched to secure the area. On arrival, Green's unit came under attack by HYDRA troopers. Green used the right gauntlet of the alien's armor to defeat them. After securing victory, Green found himself unable to remove the gauntlet and was seen walking away from the area, carrying the alien's sword with him. How the alien's other gauntlet was acquired by Southpaw has not yet been revealed, nor how the alien's leg armor came to be part of the costume of Grasshopper. However, the opposing alien's weapon later found its way into Armory's possession.

In the aftermath of the Civil War storyline, Gauntlet was recruited by Henry Peter Gyrich to be a drill sergeant at a superhero training camp. He is fully aware of the "darker" aspects of the training camp and is apparently willingly going along with some hidden agenda by the powers behind the camp's activities.

Gauntlet lives with his wife and two children on the base. He has confided in his wife that he only wants to prepare the recruits for the rough life of being a superhero and is only harsh to them in order to do so. Any sort of harm that befalls the recruits he takes as a personal failure for not teaching them well enough. He makes particular use of the New Warriors name as an insult, referring to that team's role in the disaster that sparked the Civil War's events; this not only causes friction with recruits, several of whom are former New Warriors members/associates, but also with the Avenger Justice, a New Warriors founder and a liaison/"counselor" for the young recruits.

After the events of World War Hulk, Gauntlet is angered at the many cadets who had broken orders to confront the Hulk themselves. He is badly beaten and left with a "NW" on his chest, daubed in his own blood. The team had recently learned of a social movement, indicated by "NW" graffiti, of young people in general defiance of the current power structure. Gyrich eventually has Hank Pym briefly revive him. Before going into a coma as a result, he identifies his assailant as the Ghost. It is later revealed to the reader that the attacker was none other than base recruit Slapstick, taking revenge for Gauntlet's pejorative usage of the New Warriors' name. It is known that Gyrich mobilized Pym to revive Gauntlet before a S.H.I.E.L.D. investigation could discover the truth to prevent them from also finding classified information, and was present when Gauntlet made the false identification. While Gauntlet was incapacitated, Taskmaster took over his drill instructor duties.

During Gauntlet's coma, Gyrich attempted to equip KIA with Armory's weapon, the Tactigon. After the weapon successfully bonded with KIA, the clone is flooded with memories of the original MVP's death, seeking vengeance on those involved. Arriving at Gauntlet's hospital room, the clone is surprised to find Gauntlet's bed empty. Following this, it appears the gauntlet weapon itself is temporarily controlling Green, forcing him to acquire the sword element of the alien's armor. Following an altercation with KIA, the clone's attacks appeared to cause the gauntlet to lose its control over Gauntlet, causing him to revert to his normal self. It is later revealed that when the Tactigon stabbed Gauntlet, it injected him with a drug that brought him out of his coma, as it considered his control over the weapon to be a weak point.

During an invasion of Earth by the Skrull Empire, Gauntlet and Taskmaster attempt to ensure the safety of the cadets at Camp Hammond by locking down the facility. However, a Skrull posing as Yellowjacket gives orders to Gauntlet to send the Initiative cadets to help fight the Skrulls in New York City.

Following the invasion's end, Gauntlet is placed in charge of the Camp Hammond facility. Many of the other instructors left, unwilling to place themselves under Norman Osborn's control, and the real Hank Pym declined to be a part of the Initiative, as he was never really there in the first place, leaving Gauntlet to reluctantly assume the position.

When Osborn threatened to take Gauntlet's arm, Gauntlet escaped and ultimately joined the Avengers Resistance. His wife pretends to be ashamed of him for abandoning his family, so that she will not be harassed when he is not there to protect her. As Osborn's regime ends following the Siege of Asgard, Gauntlet is sent by personal request to Afghanistan.

During the Iron Man 2020 event, Gauntlet appears as a member of Force Works. During a raid on a robot hideout, one of the robots self-destructs when cornered by War Machine and Gauntlet. Maria Hill mentioned to War Machine that Gauntlet will be in the hospital for a few weeks.

Powers and abilities
Green's right hand is fused to a large, robotic gauntlet of alien origin, which is able to manifest a right hand made of pure energy that is larger, stronger and more durable than his own. The gauntlet itself appears to have the ability to exert a certain degree of control upon Green, specifically when he is in a state of low-brain activity. Gauntlet can not only use the reliquary for manifesting energy limbs, but also discharging machinery and cybernetics debilitating energy as concussive blasts. It can also surround its wearer in an energy field to enable self propelled flight. In addition to these superpowers, Gauntlet is also a highly trained member of the United States Army.

Other versions

The Reckoning War

In one possible, seemingly inevitable, future timeline, the Gauntlet inspires Southpaw to reform, and become a superhero, while his daughter Kid Glove acts as her sidekick. He sports a more traditional superhero costume and is seemingly linked to a cosmic event known as "The Reckoning War".

References

External links
 Gauntlet at Marvel Wiki
 Gauntlet at Comic Vine
 

Characters created by Dan Slott
Characters created by Eric Powell
Comics characters introduced in 2006
Fictional African-American people
Fictional military sergeants
Fictional United States Army personnel
Marvel Comics superheroes